Black Pearl (Hangul: 블랙펄) was a South Korean girl group that debuted in 2007. Their debut lineup consisted of Nami, Hwieun, Youngjoo, and Mikka. In 2009, Mikka left due to personal reasons, and was replaced by new member Jungmin. When the group debuted in 2007, they were marketed as the next girl group to dominate charts alongside hitmakers of the such as Wonder Girls and Kara. They were also known to follow the steps of SG Wannabe, SeeYa, and M2M. They disbanded in 2012.

History

Debut (2007) 
On July 16, 2007, Black Pearl debuted on M! Countdown with their first single "Joheungeol Eotteokhae", with an R&B sound. Later, they released their second digital song called "Gyeor Gug... Neojanha". The group also released the songs "What Can I Do" and "Finally You".

Multiple projects and collaborations (2008–2010) 
In May 2008, members Nami and Young Joo were selected to participate in a special unit called Color Pink, alongside Lee Hae-ri, Kang Min-kyung of Davichi, Lee Bo-ram, and Kim Yeon-ji of SeeYa, who were all part of Core Contents Media at the time. They also released a collaboration with South Korean rapper Mario, called "Hateful Love", which was performed from November to December 2008.
In 2010, Mikka left the group for personal reasons. Later, she opened her own clothing line.

Gogossing (2010) 
In 2010, Black Pearl released the song "Gogossing", which was promoted for four months on Mnet's M! Countdown. They were regarded as Core Contents Media's next big group, alongside labelmates Co-ed School and T-ara.

Hiatus & disbandment (2011–2012) 
After their hit in the previous year, members focused on solo activities in 2011. Although Core Contents Media never made an official announcement, the group is considered effectively disbanded since 2012.

Members

Final lineup 

 Youngjoo - (Hangul: 영주) born Na Young-joo (Hangul: 나영주) in Seoul, South Korea.

Former 

Discography

Extended plays

Singles

References 

K-pop music groups
MBK Entertainment artists
Musical groups disestablished in 2012
Musical groups established in 2007
South Korean girl groups